Herb Donaldson may refer to:

Herb Donaldson (American football) (born 1985), American football running back 
Herb Donaldson (lawyer), LGBT civil rights advocate